Peter Thomas Coleman (born September 9, 1959) is a social psychologist and researcher in the field of conflict resolution and sustainable peace. Coleman is best known for his work on intractable conflicts and applying complexity science.

Coleman is a professor at Columbia University and the executive director of the Advanced Consortium on Cooperation, Conflict, and Complexity (AC4) and the Morton Deutsch International Center for Cooperation and Conflict Resolution. Coleman also serves on the faculty in the Negotiation and Conflict Resolution masters program at Columbia's School of Professional Studies.

Early life and education
Coleman grew up in the 1960s in Chicago and experienced school desegregation, a violent anti-war movement, and a non-violent civil rights movement first hand. These experiences instilled a strong sense of macro worry: concern over the state of our society and our world. He received a B.A. from the University of Iowa in 1981. After working with violent youth in New York City in the 1980s, Coleman returned to academics to study how to use science as a tool to address social ills.

Eventually, Coleman trained as a mediator for the New York State Criminal Court system, and began his studies with the conflict resolution eminent theorist, Morton Deutsch, and a doctorate in social and organizational psychology from Columbia University.

Career at Columbia University
Coleman has been a professor at Columbia University since the 1990s. His early work with Morton Deutsch led to the publication of the first of three editions of The Handbook on Conflict Resolution: Theory and Practice, a comprehensive book designed for professionals in the field of conflict resolution emphasizing the constructive potential of conflict . Coleman has studied some of the more marginalized yet critical aspects of peace and conflict dynamics, including issues such as the use and abuse of social power, intractable conflict, humiliation and conflict, polarized collective identity formation, culture and conflict, injustice and conflict, and sustainable peace. These phenomena can manifest themselves in families, schools and other organizations, communities, and nations. They tend to be complex, long-lasting, and difficult to work with, and thus are relatively understudied by contemporary social scientists.  Coleman's approach has been to develop conceptual models that address gaps in existing theory, often through eliciting insights from informed participants (local stakeholders and practitioners), and then to empirically test the models using a variety of methods.  His scholarship aims to bridge the theory-practice gap in the field of conflict resolution and peace studies by bringing new insights from research to bear on important technical and social problems, and by honoring practical expertise in the development of new theory.

In the area of conflict intractability, Coleman's work focuses on the dynamics involved in seemingly unsolvable conflicts; both generally as whole systems as well as specifically through the investigation of key components of these problems. This has included research on the underlying motivational processes involved, identity formation and change under these conditions, the role moral emotions play in sustaining such conflicts, and differences in the complexity of the dynamics between more and less destructive forms of conflict. This work culminated into the book, The Five Percent: Finding Solutions to (Seemingly) Impossible Conflicts.

Affiliations and awards
In 2015, Morton Deutsch Conflict Resolution Award from the American Psychological Association, Division 48: Society for the Study of Peace, Conflict, and Violence.

In 2000, he  CPR Institute for Dispute Resolution Book Prize for Excellence for The Handbook of Conflict Resolution: Theory and Practice edited by Morton Deutsch & Peter T. Coleman.

2003, Coleman   recipient of the first Early Career Award from the American Psychological Association, Division 48: Society for the Study of Peace, Conflict, and Violence.

He is also Founding board member of the Gbowee Peace Foundation USA and a founding member of the United Nations Mediation Support Unit Academic Advisory Council, at UNDPA. Coleman currently serves on the editorial boards of Peace and Conflict: Journal of Peace Psychology and Conflict Resolution Quarterly,

Books   
Coleman, P. T. and Ferguson, R. (2014). Making Conflict Work: Harnessing the Power of Disagreement. New York: Houghton-Mifflin-Harcourt.

Coleman, P. T., Deutsch, M., & Marcus, E. (Eds.) (2014). The Handbook of Conflict Resolution: Theory and Practice, 3rd Edition. San Francisco: Jossey-Bass. Translated into Japanese (2003), Polish (2006).

Vallacher, R., Coleman, P. T., Nowak, A., Bui-Wrzosinska, L., Kugler, K., Bartoli, A., & Liebovitch, L. (2013). Attracted to Conflict: The Dynamic Foundations of Malignant Social Relations. Springer.

Coleman, P. T. & Deutsch, M. (Eds., July, 2012). The Psychological Components of a Sustainable Peace. Springer Books. Four authored chapters. Coleman, P. T. (Ed., 2012). Conflict, Justice, and Interdependence: The Legacy of Morton Deutsch. Springer Books. Three authored chapters.

Coleman, P. T. (Ed., 2012). Conflict, Justice, and Interdependence: The Legacy of Morton Deutsch. Springer Books. Three authored chapters.

Coleman, P. T. (2011). The Five Percent: Finding Solutions to (Seemingly) Impossible Conflicts. New York: Public Affairs, Perseus Books.

Deutsch, M., Coleman, P. T., & Marcus, E. (Eds.) (2000, 2006 2nd Edition). The Handbook of Conflict Resolution: Theory and Practice. San Francisco: Jossey- Bass. Translated into Japanese (2003), Polish (2006).

References

21st-century American psychologists
1959 births
Living people
Peace psychologists
20th-century American psychologists